List of conflicts in Australia is a timeline of events that includes wars, battles, rebellions, skirmishes, massacres, riots, and other related events that have occurred in the country of Australia's current geographical area, both before and after federation.

Conflicts fought between Indigenous Australians and European settlers are known collectively by some historians as the Australian frontier wars.

17th century
 1629: The Dutch East India Company sailing ship Batavia struck a reef near Beacon Island off the Western Australian coast.  A subsequent mutiny and massacre took place among the survivors.

18th century
 1790–1816: Hawkesbury and Nepean Wars
 1790–1802: Pemulwuy's War
 1795: Battle of Richmond Hill
 1797: Battle of Parramatta
 1804–1805:Tedbury's War

19th century
 1804: Castle Hill convict rebellion
 1808–1810: Rum Rebellion
 1816: Appin massacre
 1821–1827: Bathurst Wars
 1818: Minnamurra River massacre
 1824: Bathurst War
 1826: 1826 Norfolk Island Convict Rebellion
 1827–1828: Corn Field Raids of 1827-1828
 1828: Cape Grim massacre
 1828–1832: Black War
 1829: Cyprus mutiny
 1830s–1840s: Wiradjuri Wars
 1830: Bathurst Rebellion
 1830–1850: The Port Phillip District Wars
 1831–1833: Yagan Resistance
 1833 or 1834: Convincing Ground massacre
 1834: 1834 Norfolk Island Convict Rebellion
 1834–1849 or 1860s: The Eumeralla Wars
 1834: Battle of Pinjarra
 1836: Mount Dispersion massacre
1836: Mount Cottrell massacre
1838: The Mount Cottrell massacre 
1838: The Waterloo Plains massacre
 1838: Waterloo Creek massacre
 1838–1841: Wiradjuri Wars
 1838: Myall Creek massacre
 1838: Battle of Broken River
1838: Waterloo Plains massacre
 1839: Murdering Gully massacre
 1839: Campaspe Plains massacre
 1839: Blood Hole massacre
 1840: Battle of Yering
1840: Fighting Hills massacre
1840: Fighting Waterholes massacre
1841: The Rufus River massacre
1842–1852: Mandandanji Land War
1842: 1842 Norfolk Island Convict Rebellion
1842: Pelican Creek tragedy 
1842: Evans Head massacre
 1843: Warrigal Creek massacre 
 1843: Battle of One Tree Hill 
 1843–1855: War of Southern Queensland 
 1844–1845: Port Augusta War 
 1840–1850: Gippsland massacres
 1845: Darkey Flat Massacre
 1846: Cooking Pot Uprising 
 1846:  Blanket Bay massacre 
 1848: Avenue Range Station massacre
 1849: Waterloo Bay massacre
 1851–1854: Eureka Rebellion
 1851: Forest Creek Monster Meeting
 1853: Anti-Gold Licence Association
 1853: Bendigo Petition
 1854: Ballarat Reform League
 1854: Battle of Eureka Stockade
 1853: East Ballina massacre
 1857: Hornet Bank massacre
 1857: Buckland riot
 1857–1858: Massacre of the Yeeman
 1860–1861: Lambing Flat Riots
 1861: Battle of Yindurupilly
 1861: Cullin-La-Ringo massacre
 1865: La Grange expedition
 1867: Goulbolba Hill massacre
 1868: Flying Foam Massacre
 1870–1890: Kalkadoon Wars
 1873: Battle Camp massacre
 1874–1875: Blackfellow's Creek massacre
 1874: Barrow Creek massacre
 1877 'Showdown on the Bridge' in Branxholm
 1879: Cape Bedford massacre
 1880s: Koonchera Point massacre 
 1884: Battle of Battle Mountain
 1880s–1890s: Arnhem Wars
 1890: Speewah massacre
 1891: Australian shearers' strike
 1894–1897: Jandamarra Guerilla War

20th century
 1914–1918: First World War
 1914: Battle of Cocos
 1915: Battle of Broken Hill
 1915: Mistake Creek massacre
 1916: Mowla Bluff massacre
 1916: Liverpool riot 
 1917: Raid on the Queensland Government Printing Office 
 1918: Darwin rebellion
1919: Red Flag riots
1919: Battle of the Barricades
 1920: Broome race riots
 1923: Victorian Police strike
 1924: Bedford Downs massacre
 1926: Forrest River massacre
 1928: Coniston massacre
 1929: Rothbury riot
 1932: Emu war
 1932–1934: Caledon Bay crisis

 1939–1945: Second World War
Axis naval activity in Australian waters
 1941: Sinking of HMAS Sydney
 1942: Attack on Sydney Harbour
 1942: Shelling of Newcastle
 1943: Shelling of Port Gregory
 1943: Convoy GP55
 1944: German submarine U-862
Air raids on Australia, 1942–43
 1942–1945: North Western Area Campaign
 1942: Bombing of Darwin
 1942: Attack on Broome
 1942: Koolama
 1943: Raid on Darwin (2 May 1943)
 1942: Townsville mutiny
 1942: Battle of Brisbane
 1944: Cowra Breakout
 1979: Star Hotel riot
 1984: Milperra massacre
 1987: Brewarrina riot
 1988: Fremantle Prison riot
 1996: Parliament House riot

21st century
 2004: Redfern riots
 2005: Cronulla riots
 2005: Macquarie Fields riots
 2012: Sydney anti-Islam film protests

See also
 Military history of Australia
 History of Australia
 Australian frontier wars
 List of massacres of Indigenous Australians

References

Australia
Conflicts
Military history of Australia